Lakeview is an unincorporated community and census-designated place in Platte County, Nebraska, United States. Its population was 317 as of the 2010 census.

Geography

Demographics

References

Unincorporated communities in Platte County, Nebraska
Unincorporated communities in Nebraska
Census-designated places in Platte County, Nebraska
Census-designated places in Nebraska